Dr. Caligari is a 1989 American avant-garde horror erotic film co-written and directed by Stephen Sayadian and starring Madeleine Reynal, Laura Albert, Gene Zerna, David Parry, Fox Harris and Jennifer Balgobin. It is a quasi-sequel to the 1920 film The Cabinet of Dr. Caligari. The film details a disturbed doctor (the granddaughter of the original Dr. Caligari) and her illegal experiments on her patients.

Originally and briefly billed as Dr. Caligari 3000 when it debuted at select theaters in 1989, the film promptly faded into obscurity. Since it was released on VHS and limited Betamax format, the title has been Dr. Caligari. The film is considered a cult classic and has been shown as a "midnight movie" at various times.

Plot
The main plot involves Dr. Caligari's experiments with her patients at the C.I.A. (Caligari Insane Asylum), where she transfers glandular brain fluids from one patient to another. Two of her main patients, Mr. Pratt, a cannibalistic serial killer, and Mrs. Van Houten, a nymphomanical housewife, are the primary subjects of her mindswapping. Mrs. Van Houten becomes the cannibal and Mr. Pratt the nymphomaniac, although they seem to still retain some elements of themselves as well. Apparently, Caligari's unconventional idea is to cure people by introducing equally opposite traits to balance out disturbed minds, but this is never explicitly stated in the film.

Several other doctors, a married couple (Mr. and Mrs. Lodger) become concerned with Caligari's experiments and approach Mrs. Lodger's father, Dr. Avol, who confronts Caligari only to fall victim to her mindswapping and receive an injection of Mrs. Van Houten's brain fluid, turning him into a transvestite nymphomaniac. Sex is a prominent theme throughout the movie, especially for Mrs. Van Houten, who appears topless and performs masturbation at several points, but there are no hardcore scenes, as this was released as an R-rated feature. By the end of the film, Mrs. Van Houten has injected Dr. Caligari with her own nymphomaniacal brain fluid and herself with Caligari's ancestor's (the original Dr. Caligari from The Cabinet of Dr. Caligari); thus the patient becomes the doctor, the doctor becomes the patient and the inmates are left to run the asylum.

Cast

 Madeleine Reynal as Dr. Caligari
 Fox Harris as Dr. Avol
 Laura Albert as Mrs. Van Houten
 Jennifer Balgobin as Ramona Lodger
 John Durbin as Gus Pratt
 Gene Zerna as Les Van Houten
 David Parry as Dr. Lodger
 Barry Phillips as Cesare
 Magie Song as Patient in Straitjacket
 Jennifer Miro as Miss Koonce
 Stephen Quadros as Scarecrow
 Carol Albright as Screaming Patient
 Catherine Case as Patient with Extra Hormones
 Debra De Liso as Grace Butler (as Debra Deliso)
 Lori Chacko as Patient in Bed

Release
Dr. Caligari was shown at the Toronto Festival of Festivals on August 30, 1989.

Critical reaction
From a contemporary review, "Devo." of Variety found the film to have a "weak attempt" at "campy dialog and bizarre plot twists" and that "even discriminating cult movie mavens may sit this one out."

A retrospective review from the Los Angeles Times wrote "One of the kinkiest artifacts ever to come out of Orange County has to be the movie "Dr. Caligari.""

Home video
The film was also released in America on Laserdisc by Image Entertainment. At the same time, Shapiro Glickenhaus Entertainment released it on VHS. Excalibur Films, despite mostly dealing with pornographic film, released it on DVD on August 23, 2002. as the company was formed by the film's executive producer.

References

Sources

External links

Dr. Caligari at Roxie
Official trailer

1989 horror films
1989 films
American science fiction horror films
American comedy horror films
Films about cannibalism
1980s parody films
Films with screenplays by Jerry Stahl
1980s comedy horror films
1980s science fiction horror films
1980s erotic films
American erotic horror films
1989 comedy films
1980s English-language films
1980s American films